Gidney is a surname. Notable people with the surname include:

Brian Gidney (1938–2019), English cricketer 
Craig Laurance Gidney, American novelist and writer
Dirk Gidney (born 1952), Canadian rower
Francis Gidney (1890–1928), leader of the Scouting movement in the United Kingdom 
Sir Henry Gidney (1873–1942), English research scholar and a lecturer in ophthalmology
Herbert Gidney (1881–1963), American athlete

See also
Gidney was also the name of one of the Moon Men on the American animated television program Rocky and Bullwinkle.